Life imprisonment in Spain was introduced by the Ley Orgánica 1/2015 in March 2015, effective from 1 July 2015. The sentence can be revised, so it is officially called "revisable permanent imprisonment".

History
The legislation establishing such a sentence was passed with 181 votes in favour, 138 against and two abstentions. All votes in favour came from the right-wing governing People's Party.

Life imprisonment had previously been introduced in 1822 as a life sentence of forced labour, and in 1848 was revised as life in prison. In 1870, this was reformed to allow the possibility of parole after 30 years; at this time all life prisoners were detained in North Africa or the Canary Islands.

In 1928, the military dictatorship of Miguel Primo de Rivera removed life imprisonment from the statute books, though the death penalty remained. Capital punishment was retained under Francisco Franco, and the maximum prison sentence was of 30 years. After the Spanish transition to democracy, the death penalty was abolished and the maximum prison sentence remained at 30 until November 2003, when the conservative government of José María Aznar increased it to 40 years for convicted terrorists.

After the adoption of the current statute in 2015, the Spanish Socialist Workers' Party (PSOE) challenged it at the Constitutional Court. In October 2021, by seven votes to three, life imprisonment was deemed constitutional.

Murders are punished with life imprisonment in the following cases:

When the victim is under the age of 16;
When the victim is particularly vulnerable;
When the murder takes place with sexual offences;
When the murderer is part of a criminal organisation;
When it is a multiple murder;
When the victim is the monarch, consort or heir to the throne;
When the victim is a foreign head of state;
Cases of Terrorism;
Cases of genocide or crimes against humanity.

Convicts must serve between 25 to 35 years of their sentence, depending on the severity of their crimes, before being eligible for parole.

Cases
As of October 2021, 28 people have been sentenced to a reviewable permanent prison sentence, under the 2015 legislation. Five have been women. As of December 2019, after the conviction for the high-profile murder of Diana Quer, Galicia and Andalusia were the autonomous communities with the most life sentences, with three each.  Four convicts had their sentences revoked and replaced by determinate prison sentences.

David Oubel: First person to be sentenced to a PPR. He was convicted on 6 July 2017 for the murder of his two minor daughters.
Sergio Díaz: Convicted on 23 March 2018 for brutally killing his partner's disabled grandfather for stabbing and beating with a marble statue. In January 2019, the Supreme Court quashed the sentence on a technicality due to the way in which the victim's disability was handled as an aggravating factor, and Díaz was instead sentenced to 24 years in prison.
Daniel Montaño: Convicted on 26 September 2018 for murdering a 17-month-old girl.
Marcos Miras: Convicted on 17 October 2018 for murdering his 11-year-old son.
Patrick Nogueira: Convicted on 15 November 2018, three permanent prison sentences for killing his uncle and his two infant cousins, and another 24 years for the murder of his aunt. 
Pablo Catalán: Sentenced to reviewable permanent prison on 7 March 2019 for murdering and raping a woman. First conviction in Catalonia. 
Francisco Salvador: First conviction for a case of gender violence. He was convicted on 7 April 2019 for murdering and raping his former partner.
Enrique Romay Reina: Convicted on 24 April 2019 for attempted rape and subsequent murder of a woman.
José Rafael García Santana: Convicted on 8 May 2019, for stabbing to death his disabled wife. The sentence was annulled due to a lack of substantiation by the jury; in September 2020 in a retrial García Santana was sentenced to 23 years in prison.
Roberto Hernández: Convicted on 5 June 2019 for raping and murdering his partner's daughter. 
Ana Julia Quezada: Convicted on 30 September 2019 for murdering her partner's son. She was the first woman to be sentenced to a PPR. 
Mounir Ayad: Convicted on 6 November 2019 for murdering his partner and son. 
José Enrique Abuín Gey, aka "El Chicle". Convicted on 17 December 2019 for the murder of Diana Quer. 
Ada de la Torre: Convicted on 27 December 2019 for murdering her 9-year-old daughter. Second woman to be sentenced to a PPR.
Gonzalo Sánchez C.: Convicted on 14 February 2020 for murdering his disabled aunt and partner, who died of multiple hemorrhages.
Rubén Mañó: Convicted on 12 August 2020 of raping and murdering a 15-year-old female friend.
Antonio Pérez Vázquez and Cristina Jiménez Moraleda: Convicted on 30 September 2020 of constant abuse and fatal strangling of the latter's two-year-old son. In April 2021, the sentence was quashed by the Supreme Court of Justice of the Valencian Community on the basis of premeditation not being proven; the parents had taken the boy to hospital, where he later died. They were instead each sentenced to 20 years for causing his death, plus three years for cruelty.
Iván Pardo Pena: Convicted on 7 October 2020 of abusing and murdering his 8-year-old niece.
Alejandra García Peregrino: Convicted on 25 November 2020 of murdering her partner's 8-year-old foster son.
Ana María Baños: Convicted on 9 April 2021 of murdering her son 7-year-old foster son.
Norbert Feher, aka "Ígor el Ruso": Convicted on 29 April 2021 of for the murder of the rancher José Luis Iranzo and the two civil guards Víctor Romero and Víctor Jesús Caballero.
Silvia Acebal Martínez: Convicted on 27 May 2021 of the murder of her newborn baby with 53 stab wounds. First PPR sentence in Asturias.
Francisco Javier Martínez Broch: Convicted on 1 June 2021 for the murder of his parents and his brother.
Juan Francisco López Ortiz: Convicted on 8 June 2021 for the kidnap, rape and murder of a 13-year-old girl in Vilanova i la Geltrú, Catalonia in 2018. Received an additional seven-year sentence for the sexual offences and was made to pay €445,000 to the victim's family.
Juan Carlos Jiménez Jiménez and his son Emilio Jiménez Jiménez: Convicted on 16 June 2021 for the fatal shooting in 2018 of a man and his two sons, all of whom were related to the son-in-law/brother-in-law of the perpetrators. Juan Carlos, the shooter, received 20 years each for the first two murders in addition to a life sentence for the third; Emilio, who supplied the weapons, received 15 years each for the first two in addition to a life sentence for the third. €961,247 was also ordered in compensation. The crimes, which took place in Cáseda, resulted in the first life sentences in the region of Navarre.
Irene Torres Torres and Joey Lee Mederos Martín: Convicted on 4 October 2021 a crime of murder of a five-month-old baby.
Bernardo Montoya: Convicted on 10 December 2021 for rape and the murder of Laura Luelmo.

References

Sources
Reform on Penal Code (full text, Spanish).

Spain
Law of Spain